Neo Boys was an American punk band from Portland, Oregon, United States, active from 1978-1983. Considered Portland's first all-female punk band, Neo Boys are noted for their political and feminist lyrics. Hannah Lew, of Grass Widow, wrote: "They created a world I have taken refuge in during times when I felt the effects of narrow attitudes about gender and women's voices in music."

History 
Before Neo Boys was formed, Kim Kincaid, K.T. Kincaid and Jennifer LoBianco were part of Formica and the Bitches. The band only played a few shows before breaking up.

Neo Boys band members included Kim Kincaid (vocals), K.T. Kincaid (bass), Jennifer LoBianco (guitar) and Pat Baum (drums).  After Jennifer LoBianco left the Neoboys, Carol Steinel played guitar with the band from 1979 to 1980, followed by Meg Hentges who joined as a guitarist in 1980. Jennifer went on to form the band, Randy and the Randies before leaving for Los Angeles in 1980.

They regularly shared bills with The Wipers, opened for Nico, and played their first show with Television. Most of their early shows were performed in basements, colleges, and art galleries.

Keeping with the punk template at the time, the band started as four teens making loud sounds and writing self-reflective lyrics. But this quartet was one of the first all-female groups of its kind in Portland, distinct when compared to the city's male-dominated music scene.

Neo Boys were featured in Northwest Passage: The Birth of Portland's DIY Culture.

Discography

EPs 
 Crumbling Myths (1982, self-released)
 Neo Boys (1980, Greg Sage's Trap Records), Tracks: "Never Comes Down", "Give Me the Message" and "Rich Man’s Dream"

Compilations/Live 
 10/29/79 (1979, Live LP, also featuring The Wipers and Sado-Nation)
Sooner or Later (2013, 2CD, K Records/Mississippi Records)

Documentary
 Northwest Passage: The Birth of Portland's DIY Culture

References

External links 
 Neo Boys (Live at the Long Good-Bye, 1979)
 Neo boys (K Records)
 Neo Boys Bandcamp
 Screams From the Vault: The Neo Boys

All-female punk bands
Musical groups from Portland, Oregon
1978 establishments in Oregon
Musical groups established in 1978
1983 disestablishments in Oregon
Musical groups disestablished in 1983
Proto-riot grrrl bands
Punk rock groups from Oregon